The 2022 Matsuyama Challenger was a professional tennis tournament played on hard courts. It was the 1st edition of the tournament which was part of the 2022 ATP Challenger Tour. It took place in Matsuyama, Japan between 7 and 13 November 2022.

Singles main-draw entrants

Seeds

 1 Rankings are as of 31 October 2022.

Other entrants
The following players received wildcards into the singles main draw:
  Sho Katayama
  Yusuke Kusuhara
  Shintaro Mochizuki

The following player received entry into the singles main draw using a protected ranking:
  Yūichi Sugita

The following player received entry into the singles main draw as a special exempt:
  Hsu Yu-hsiou

The following player received entry into the singles main draw as an alternate:
  Sho Shimabukuro

The following players received entry from the qualifying draw:
  Hong Seong-chan
  Jason Jung
  Ergi Kırkın
  Koki Matsuda
  Mukund Sasikumar
  Shuichi Sekiguchi

The following players received entry as lucky losers:
  Naoki Nakagawa
  Yuta Shimizu

Champions

Singles

  Hong Seong-chan def.  Wu Tung-lin 6–3, 6–2.

Doubles

  Andrew Harris /  John-Patrick Smith def.  Toshihide Matsui /  Kaito Uesugi 6–3, 4–6, [10–8].

References

2022 ATP Challenger Tour
2022 in Japanese tennis
November 2022 sports events in Japan